Wifey may refer to: 
"Wifey" (song), a 2000 song by Next
"Wifey", a 2022 song by Rubi Rose
Wifey (novel), a 1978 novel by Judy Blume
"Wifey", a song on by Taiwanese band S.H.E on their 2007 album Play